Birgitta Hosea (born 1966) is a British animation artist of Scottish and Swedish descent. She explores diverse themes such as identity, spirituality and traces of existence. Her work combines a range of media such as shadow puppets, drawing, manipulated video, paper sculpture, animation, holographic projection, live video feeds and interactive technology – with the performance.

Exhibitions 
 Recent works include ʻSKYPE vs Night Skyʼ for the Papay Nights festival, Orkney (2011)
 ʻChatterʼ at the Cinematic Arts Gallery, Los Angeles (2010)
 ʻWhite Linesʼ at Kinetica Art Fair and Shunt, London (2010) 
 ʻOut There in the Darkʼ at the British Film Institute, London and Mix 23 Queer Experimental Film Festival, New York (2010)

References

British women artists
Living people
1966 births